Moses Levi (or Moshe HaLevi Effendi) (1827–1910) was the chief rabbi of Constantinople and of the Ottoman Empire.

Levi was first appointed to the rabbinical court on behest of his father. He later was appointed to the position of chief rabbi following the emigration of Rabbi Yakir Giron.

References 

1827 births
1910 deaths
Rabbis from the Ottoman Empire